The floorball competition at the 2017 World Games took place from 27 to 30 July 2017, in Wroclaw, Poland.

Results

Preliminary round

Group A

Group B

Knock-out stage

Semifinals

5th place match

Bronze medal game

Final

Final ranking

References

2017 World Games
2017
2017 in floorball